The Cordillera Occidental range is one of two main mountain ranges in the Andes in Ecuador, the other being the Cordillera Central. It spans the whole country from north to south. The highest peak of the Cordillera Occidental is Chimborazo (6,267 m).

See also
 Cordillera Central (Ecuador)
 Cordillera Occidental (disambiguation)

Mountain ranges of the Andes
Occidental